The Exterminating Angels is a 2006 French erotic drama film written and directed by Jean-Claude Brisseau. It was screened at the Cannes Film Festival on 20 May 2006 and received a limited release in the United States on 7 March 2007. The film is about a director named François who embarks on a film project about female eroticism. He meets three struggling actresses who perform sexual acts in front of him. What François does not realise is that there is a lot more going on in the girls' heads than other parts and this leads to tragic consequences.

The film is semiautobiographical; in 2002, director Brisseau had been arrested on charges of harassment, fined and given a suspended one-year prison sentence. The plaintiffs were three women who had performed sexual acts in front of him during their audition.

The soundtrack for the film was composed by Jean Musy.

Cast
 Frédéric van den Driessche as François
 Maroussia Dubreuil as Charlotte
 Lise Bellynck as Julie
 Marie Allan as Stéphanie
 Raphaële Godin as Apparition 1 / Rebecca
 Margaret Zenou as Apparition 2
 Sophie Bonnet as Nathalie
 Jeanne Cellard as the grandmother
 Virginie Legeay as Virginie
 Estelle Galarme as Olivia
 Marine Danaux as Agnès
 Apolline Louis as Céline
 François Négret as Stéphanie's friend

Production
On 31 October 2007, two actresses, one of whom stars in The Exterminating Angels, accused Brisseau of rape, sexual assault and harassment for a period from August 2005 to September 2007. Allan, then aged 29, accused the director of having abused her during erotic "castings", carried out face to face and without a camera, in public places or at Brisseau's home. According to her, Brisseau would have promised a leading role in one of his films and asked for that to work these intimate scenes. Same accusations from another actress, then aged 21, who said she suffered a "digital" rape by the filmmaker. Brisseau only admitted to having had a consensual sexual relationship with the first actress. A judicial investigation was opened, the man was heard as an assisted witness, but the procedure was abandoned for lack of evidence to establish "non-consent".

References

External links
 
 
 

2006 films
2006 drama films
2006 LGBT-related films
2000s erotic drama films
2000s French-language films
Drama films based on actual events
Films about film directors and producers
Films directed by Jean-Claude Brisseau
French erotic drama films
French films based on actual events
French LGBT-related films
Lesbian-related films
LGBT-related drama films
2000s French films